is the tenth single by Japanese girl group Melon Kinenbi. It was released on September 10, 2003, and its highest position on the Oricon weekly chart was #15.

Track listing

External links
Mi Da Ra Matenrō at the Up-Front Works release list (Japanese)

2003 singles
Zetima Records singles
Song recordings produced by Tsunku